Kellie Martin (born October 16, 1975) is an American actress. She is known for her roles as Rebecca "Becca" Thatcher in Life Goes On (1989–1993), Lucy Knight on ER (1998–2000), Samantha Kinsey in the Mystery Woman TV film series (2003–2007), and as Hailey Dean in the Hailey Dean Mystery TV film series (2016–2019).

Early life
Martin began her acting career at age seven, when her aunt who was a nanny for actor Michael Landon's children helped her land a guest spot on the Landon-produced series Father Murphy. At the age of 11, she was a contestant during Young People's Week on the Bob Eubanks-hosted version of Card Sharks.

Career

Early years
Martin had a recurring role on season three of Valerie's Family: The Hogans (1987–1988). She also contributed the voice of Daphne Blake on the animated series A Pup Named Scooby-Doo in 1988–1991. In 1989, Martin began the role of Rebecca "Becca" Thacher on the family drama Life Goes On, which ran on ABC for four seasons. She also played the role of Emily in 1989's Troop Beverly Hills, starring Shelley Long. Martin also co-hosted the 1989 pilot of America's Funniest Home Videos alongside Bob Saget.

1990s

From 1991 to 1995, Martin supplied the voice of Molly Tasmanian Devil on Taz-Mania. In 1993, she played Sherry in Matinee, and made a guest appearance as Cleo Walker on an episode of seaQuest DSV, titled "Brothers and Sisters".

In 1994, she starred in her own series, Christy. Also in 1994, she starred in the Lifetime movie A Friend to Die For. In 1995, she starred in The Face on the Milk Carton, a TV film based on the book by Caroline Cooney about a teenager who finds out she was kidnapped from her real family 13 years prior and had been raised by the parents of her kidnapper. She was in A Goofy Movie as the voice of Roxanne, Max's love interest.

In 1996, Martin starred as deaf abuse-victim Laura Keyes on Lifetime's TV movie After the Silence (or Breaking Through). She starred in a made for TV movie Hidden in Silence (Lifetime Television). From 1998–2000, Martin appeared on the medical drama ER as medical student Lucy Knight. Martin was still going to Yale at the time and postponed her education so that she could join the cast. When she left ER, she stopped acting for three years and returned to Yale to finish her degree in art history.

2000s
In 2003, Martin starred in Mystery Woman, a Hallmark Channel movie about the owner of a mystery bookshop who solves actual crimes. From 2005 to 2007, she made ten more Mystery Woman movies for Hallmark, two of which she directed. Also in 2003, Martin had a supporting role on the comedic film Malibu's Most Wanted.

In 2006, she starred in the Lifetime movie Live Once, Die Twice, followed by No Brother of Mine in 2007. Also in 2007, Martin provided the voice for the adult-version of Barbara Gordon on "Artifacts", an episode of The Batman.

In 2009, Martin was a guest on Grey's Anatomy, episode "No Good at Saying Sorry." She also guest starred in the Ghost Whisperer episode "Stage Fright" as Cally O'Keefe. She has guest starred on the Private Practice episode "The Way We Were".

In 2012, she played Army Captain Nicole Galassini on the Lifetime Network television series Army Wives.

In 2016, Martin began starring in a new Hallmark Movies & Mysteries Channel show Hailey Dean Mystery as the protagonist Hailey Dean who is a former prosecutor turned therapist and solves mysteries. The Hailey Dean Mysteries are based on characters from Nancy Grace's New York Times best-selling series of mystery books about Dean.

In 2017, she played police officer Kimberly Leahy in seven episodes of the TBS comedy series The Guest Book.

Personal life
Martin graduated from Yale University in 2001 with a degree in art history. She was a member of the Saybrook Fellowship. She married Keith Christian on May 15, 1999, in his hometown of Polson, Montana. They have two daughters.

Martin owns and operates her own toy store and has authored a novel, Madam: A Novel of New Orleans from Plume.

Filmography

Film

Television

Awards and nominations

References

External links

 
 interview on Martin's exit from ER

1975 births
20th-century American actresses
21st-century American actresses
Actresses from Riverside, California
American child actresses
American film actresses
American television actresses
American voice actresses
Contestants on American game shows
Living people
Yale University alumni